The  meson is a meson composed of a bottom antiquark and a strange quark. Its antiparticle is the  meson, composed of a bottom quark and a strange antiquark.

B–B oscillations 
Strange B mesons are noted for their ability to oscillate between matter and antimatter via a box-diagram with  measured by CDF experiment at Fermilab. 
That is, a meson composed of a bottom quark and strange antiquark, the strange  meson, can spontaneously change into an bottom antiquark and strange quark pair, the strange  meson, and vice versa.

On 25 September 2006, Fermilab announced that they had claimed discovery of previously-only-theorized Bs meson oscillation. According to Fermilab's press release:

Ronald Kotulak, writing for the Chicago Tribune, called the particle "bizarre" and stated that the meson "may open the door to a new era of physics" with its proven interactions with the "spooky realm of antimatter".

Better understanding of the meson is one of the main objectives of the LHCb experiment conducted at the Large Hadron Collider.  On 24 April 2013, CERN physicists in the LHCb collaboration announced that they had observed CP violation in the decay of strange  mesons for the first time. Scientists found the Bs meson decaying into two muons for the first time, with Large Hadron Collider experiments casting doubt on the scientific theory of supersymmetry.

CERN physicist Tara Shears described the CP violation observations as "verification of the validity of the Standard Model of physics".

Rare decays 
The rare decays of the Bs meson are an important test of the Standard Model.  The branching fraction of the strange b-meson to a pair of muons is very precisely predicted with a value of Br(Bs→ µ+µ−)SM = (3.66 ± 0.23) × 10−9.  Any variation from this rate would indicate possible physics beyond the Standard Model, such as supersymmetry. The first definitive measurement was made from a combination of LHCb and CMS experiment data:

This result is compatible with the Standard Model and set limits on possible extensions.

See also 
B meson
B– oscillation

References

External links

Mesons
Strange quark
B physics